The Dipylon inscription is a short text written on an ancient Greek pottery vessel dated to ca. 740 BC. It is famous for being the oldest (or one of the oldest) known samples of the use of the Greek alphabet. The text is scratched on an oenochoe, which was found in 1871 and is named after the location where it was found, the ancient Dipylon Cemetery, near the Dipylon Gate on the area of Kerameikos in Athens. The jug is attributed to the Late Geometrical Period (750-700 BC). It is now in the National Archaeological Museum of Athens (inv. 192).

Text
The text is written in an archaic form of the Greek alphabet, with some letter shapes still resembling those of the original Phoenician alphabet. For example, the Greek letter zeta (Ζ) resembles the Phoenician letter zayin (I). The text is written from right to left, with the individual letters mirror-shaped in comparison with the modern forms. It is placed in a circle around the shoulder of the vessel. The text consists of 46 characters, of which the first 35 can easily be read as a hexametric verse in Greek. B. Powell has argued that the final characters may represent a garbled snippet from the middle of an abecedarium (ΚΛΜΝ) by a second hand, someone learning to write. More recently, N. M. Binek has shown that the last six markings can "be viewed not as letters or as attempts to inscribe letters, but rather as decorative elements fashioned by a second inscriber in accordance with the principles of Geometric idiom," inasmuch as the segment roughly mirrors the shapes of letters 9-4 (ΧΡΟΝΥΝ). The text marks the vessel as a prize in a dancing competition. It is translated as: "whoever of the dancers now dances most lightly...", and the second line is conjectured to have said something to the effect of "...he shall get this (vessel as his prize)."

The text of the inscription runs:
ΗΟΣΝΥΝΟΡΧΕΣΤΟΝΠΑΝΤΟΝΑΤΑΛΟΤΑΤΑΠΑΙΖΕΙΤΟΤΟΔΕΚΛ[?]ΜΙ[?]Ν
In modern scholarly editions this is sometimes transcribed as:

This corresponds to the following in the later classical orthography in Greek (using the Ionian form of the Greek alphabet), with the metric feet of the hexameter indicated:

Literal translation:
Whoever of all these dancers now plays most delicately,
of him this (sc. pot)...

Nestor's cup
It is believed that either the Dipylon inscription or the Nestor's Cup is the oldest known alphabetic Greek inscription. The Nestor Cup, which also bears a verse inscription, was found in an excavation at the ancient Greek colony of Pithekoussai on the island of Ischia in Italy. It is thought to be of equal age with the Dipylon inscription or slightly younger.

See also 
History of the Greek alphabet
Pottery of Ancient Greece

References

.
.
.

External links

Bibliotheca Augustana corpus: Online text and image
Epigraphical database: Online text

Greek language
Individual ancient Greek vases
Archaeological artifacts
Greek inscriptions
Iron Age Greece
Earliest known manuscripts by language
National Archaeological Museum, Athens
8th-century BC works
Archaeological discoveries in Greece
1871 archaeological discoveries